Aygun Alasgar gizi Kazimova (born 26 January 1971) is an Azerbaijani singer, songwriter, pop musician, and actress.

She is a well known singer in Azerbaijan, Turkey and Russia. Her 2006 and 2007 solo concerts in Moscow and Baku brought her fame. During 2002 – 2006 she was president of the "Best Model of Azerbaijan" competition. Her "Hayat Ona Guzel" single was the most popular in Turkey on iTunes. Kazimova wrote and sang the anthem of the FIFA U-17 Women's World Cup 2012.  Her duet with Snoop Dogg Coffee from Colombia was a number one hit on the Azerbaijani, Turkish, Czech Republic, Colombian, Georgian and Russian charts. Kazimova has recorded ten albums.

Early life
Kazimova was the youngest of the family's four children. She revealed her musical talent at the time she was a middle school student. Along with amateur music, she was passionate about handball and was the captain of the school's female handball team. She abandoned sports upon graduating from high school and entering the Maarif Technicum of Arts, before dropping out in 1986. At the time she worked with the Gaya youth band.

Career
Kazimova's professional solo career began in 1988, when she won the first prize at the Baki payizi-88 (Baku Autumn-88) music contest. In 1989 she won an award in the Yurmala music contest, and then in 1992 she won an award in "The Voice of Asia" music contest, in the Republic of Kazakhstan. Kazimova released her first album in 1997. The CD Sevgi Gulleri (Flowers of love) contained 14 tracks with most of them written by pop composer Vagif Gerayzade. She has released ten albums, with the most successful in sales being the CD Aygun which was released in October 2000 and contained multimedia files with videos and pictures. In 2002, she became 'Honorary Artist of Azerbaijan'.

Some of her awards include numerous Grand-Prix, Honoured Artist of Azerbaijan and other music awards. Along with singing, she is also deeply involved in charity work, giving free and benefit concerts for orphan children every year.

Kazimova is also an actress. In 2005, she played the title role in the musical Khari Bulbullar directed by Arif Gaziyev, the role of Sanam in the screen version of the play Meshadi Ibad. She has also hosted several television shows.

She has given concerts outside Azerbaijan, the most successful being held in Kremlin Palace, Moscow on 26 January 2006. On 20 June 2007 Aygun gave a solo concert at the T. Bakhramov stadium dedicated to the 20th anniversary of her pop music career in Azerbaijan.

She was president of the annual Best Model of Azerbaijan contest in 2002–2006.

In 2013, Kazimova collaborated with Snoop Dogg for the song 'Coffee From Columbia'.  It was released by Dokuz Sekiz Müzik and included remixes by My Digital Enemy and Bimbo Jones.

Aygun Kazimova is considered the most successful female singer in the Azerbaijani music industry and has released the largest number of best-selling singles in the history of Azerbaijan. She is also known for innovative music videos and carefully prepared stage performances.

It was reported that on 1 November 2012, Kazimova was issued an Azerbaijani diplomatic passport.

Private life 

In 1989, Kazimova married her long-time boyfriend Ibrahim Ibrahimov and in 1990 gave birth to daughter Ilgara. Ibrahimov and Kazimova divorced in 1991. In 1994 she married Rza Guliyev (nephew of Azerbaijan's ex-Speaker of the Parliament and current opposition member Rasul Guliyev), from whom she has been forcibly separated since Guliyev was taken into custody in 1996. From 2001 to 2002, she was in a relationship with Mert Kılıç. From 2004 to 2010, she was in a relationship with meykhana-singer Namiq Qaraçuxurlu.

Discography

Studio album

 Ömrüm – Günüm  (1997)
 Ah...! (1998)
 Aygün (2000)
 Sevdim (2001)
 Sevgi gülləri (2003)
 Sevərsənmi? (2005)
 Yenə tək (2008)

Compilation albums

 Aygün Kazımova, Vol. 1 (2008)
 Aygün Kazımova, Vol. 2 (2008)
 Aygün Kazımova, Vol. 3 (2008)
 Aygün Kazımova, Vol. 4 (2008)
 Sevdi Ürək (2012)
 Ya Devushka Vostochnaya (2013)
 Səni Belə Sevmədilər (2015)
 Azərbaycan Qızıyam (2015)
 Aygün Kazımovanın ifaları  (2016)
 By SS Production (2020)
 Remakes (2020)

Live albums 
 Crystal Hall (2020)

EPs 
 Duy (2018)
 Ya v Nirvane (2021)

Singles

Filmography

Television

Film

Awards

Big Apple Music Awards 
The "Big Apple Music Awards", is an annual American awards show.

Daf Bama Music Awards
The "Daf Bama Music Awards ", is an annual German awards show.

Kral Music Awards

Golden Butterfly Awards

References

External links 

 

1971 births
Living people
21st-century Azerbaijani women singers
Azerbaijani film actresses
Azerbaijani television actresses
Musicians from Baku
People's Artists of Azerbaijan
Soviet Azerbaijani people
English-language singers from Azerbaijan
Azerbaijani women pop singers
Azerbaijani jazz singers
Azerbaijani women singer-songwriters
Golden Butterfly Award winners